Maningoza can stand for:

Maningoza - a river in western Madagascar
Maningoza Reserve - a wildlife reserve, also in Western Madagascar